Anna Catarina Lindqvist Ryan (born 13 June 1963) is a former professional tennis player from Sweden.

Career
Lindqvist turned professional in 1983.  She reached a career high rank of World No. 10 in April 1985 and won five singles titles. She reached the semifinals of Grand Slam tournaments twice, the Australian Open in 1987 and Wimbledon in 1989.  She lost to Martina Navratilova in both semifinals. She retired from tennis in 1992.

Lindqvist six WTA Tour singles titles and one doubles title. She had career wins over Steffi Graf, Virginia Wade, Pam Shriver, Hana Mandlíková, Wendy Turnbull, Manuela Maleeva, Nathalie Tauziat, Dianne Fromholtz, Helena Suková, Claudia Kohde-Kilsch, Zina Garrison, Kathy Jordan, Jo Durie, and Natasha Zvereva.

She currently resides in New Jersey, and is the mother of Joakim Ryan, a defenseman for the Carolina Hurricanes.

In 2009, Lindqvist and her husband Bill Ryan bought the East Brunswick Racquet Club  in East Brunswick, New Jersey, where currently Lindqvist is the head teaching pro .

WTA Tour finals

Singles: 10 (5–5)

Doubles: 2 (0–2)

Grand Slam singles performance timeline

ITF finals

Singles finals: (3-2)

Doubles finals: (1-1)

References

External links
 
 
 
 
 
 

1963 births
Hopman Cup competitors
Living people
Olympic tennis players of Sweden
People from Rumson, New Jersey
Swedish female tennis players
Tennis players at the 1988 Summer Olympics
Tennis players at the 1992 Summer Olympics